Fukri is a 2017 Indian Malayalam-language comedy-drama film written and directed by Siddique and starring Jayasurya. It was produced by Siddique, Vaishak Rajan, and Jenso Jose under the banners of S Talkies and Vaishaka Cynyma.

Plot
An engineering dropout, Lucky is in pursuit of quick moneymaking plans but finds himself trapped in one trouble after the other. He is accompanied by his friends; Franklin, Kunjappu and Venkatesh Iyer. Once he meets a college girl Nafsi and her cousin Sana, and his life takes a new turn.

Cast

 Jayasurya as Lucky / Luqmaan Ali Fukri
 Siddique as Sulaiman Fukri
 Lal as Ramzan Ali Fukri
 Anu Sithara as Alia Ali Fukri
 Prayaga Martin as Nafsi
 John Kaippallil as Ubaid
 Krishna Praba as Clara
 Bhagath Manuel as Franklin
 Niyas Backer as Vasantha Kumar
 Nirmal Palazhi as Kunjappu 
 Moideen Koya as Chief Judge
 Joju George as Usman
 Janardhanan as Venkatesh Iyer
 K. P. A. C. Lalitha as Bhagyalakshmi's Mother
 Sreelatha Namboothiri as Sulaiman's Elder Sister
 Thesni Khan as Nabeesa
 Reena as Hajira
 Seema G. Nair as Bhagyalakshmi's Relative
 Jayakrishnan as Raghunath
 Naseer Sankranthi as the man at the temple
 Salini.R.T as Sana
 Sajan Palluruthy as Driver
 Vinayak p as the Hindu Priest

Production
The filming started in late September. It was slated for 2016 Christmas release but due to association issues, release was delayed.  Jayasurya signed into play the lead role in Siddique's for the first time, while Madonna Sebastian was considered for the one of the female leads. Anu Sithara signed into play second female lead. Prayaga Martin replaced the former.

Release
The film grossed 1.53 crore in its opening day at Kerala box office.

References

External links

Films directed by Siddique
2017 films
2010s Malayalam-language films
Indian comedy-drama films
2017 comedy films